The following television stations operate on virtual channel 19 in the United States:

 K10JW-D in Verdigre, Nebraska
 K14MI-D in Niobrara, Nebraska
 K15LM-D in McAlester, Oklahoma
 K15MR-D in Fargo, North Dakota
 K19AA-D in Altus, Oklahoma
 K19FD-D in Camp Verde, Arizona
 K19FY-D in Chico, California
 K19GS-D in Rural Beaver, etc., Utah
 K19IC-D in Eureka, California
 K19IP-D in Flagstaff, Arizona
 K19JA-D in Cortez, Colorado
 K19JX-D in Yakima, Washington
 K19LI-D in St. James, Minnesota
 K19MS-D in Alexandra, Minnesota
 K19MZ-D in Arriba, Colorado
 K19NB-D in Gustine, California
 K19NE-D in Gateway, Colorado
 K19NF-D in Socorro, New Mexico
 K20KE-D in Denver, Colorado
 K24CT-D in Alamogordo, New Mexico
 K26PA-D in Ardmore, Oklahoma
 K27NI-D in Neligh, Nebraska
 K32MF-D in Red Lake, Minnesota
 K32MG-D in Enid, Oklahoma
 K34IB-D in Decatur, Nebraska
 KBBV-CD in Bakersfield, California
 KCPT in Kansas City, Missouri
 KDMI in Des Moines, Iowa
 KEPR-TV in Pasco, Washington
 KGBS-CD in Austin, Texas
 KGRF-LD in Gila River Indian Co, Arizona
 KHDF-CD in Las Vegas, Nevada
 KIPB-LD in Pine Bluff, Arkansas
 KJRE in Ellendale, North Dakota
 KJYK-LD in Beaumont, Texas
 KKTW-LD in Minneapolis, Minnesota
 KMBY-LD in Templeton, California
 KOBS-LD in San Antonio, Texas
 KPDR-LD in Salt Lake City, Utah
 KQCW-DT in Muskogee, Oklahoma
 KTEJ in Jonesboro, Arkansas
 KTEV-LD in Texarkana, Arkansas
 KUES in Richfield, Utah
 KUVS-DT in Modesto, California
 KVBA-LD in Alamogordo, New Mexico
 KVCT in Victoria, Texas
 KWBQ in Santa Fe, New Mexico
 KWKS in Colby, Kansas
 KWWE-LD in Lake Charles, Louisiana
 KXNE-TV in Norfolk, Nebraska
 KYTX in Nacogdoches, Texas
 KZUP-CD in Baton Rouge, Louisiana
 W19CO-D in Pensacola, Florida
 W19DN-D in Macon, Georgia
 W19DW-D in Columbus, Georgia
 W19EE-D in Jacksonville, Illinois
 W19EF-D in Greenville, Mississippi
 W19EZ-D in Houghton Lake, Michigan
 W19FA-D in Bangor, Maine
 W19FB-D in Traverse City, Michigan
 W19FD-D in Terre Haute, Indiana
 W35DY-D in Sterling-Dixon, Illinois
 WAPW-CD in Abingdon, etc., Virginia
 WCAV in Charlottesville, Virginia
 WCLL-CD in Columbus, Ohio
 WCSC-TV in Charleston, South Carolina
 WDCQ-TV in Bad Axe, Michigan
 WDNI-CD in Indianapolis, Indiana
 WDSF-LD in Montgomery, Alabama
 WEPA-LD in Erie, Pennsylvania
 WEYW-LP in Key West, Florida
 WFND-LD in Findlay, Ohio
 WGCT-LD in Crystal River, Florida
 WGSR-LD in Reidsville, North Carolina
 WHLZ-LD in Harrisburg, Pennsylvania
 WHNT-TV in Huntsville, Alabama
 WHOI in Peoria, Illinois
 WKPT-CD in Kingsport, Tennessee
 WKPT-TV in Kingsport, Tennessee
 WKPZ-CD in Kingsport, Tennessee
 WLOW-LD in Charleston, South Carolina
 WLTX in Columbia, South Carolina
 WMAH-TV in BIloxi, Mississippi
 WMMF-LD in Vero Beach, Florida
 WODR-LD in Wausau, Wisconsin
 WOHZ-CD in Mansfield, Ohio
 WOIO in Shaker Heights, Ohio
 WOPI-CD in Bristol, Virginia/Kingsport, Tennessee
 WOTM-LD in Birmingham, Alabama
 WPCW in Jeannette, Pennsylvania
 WPED-LD in Jackson, Tennessee
 WSPZ-LD in DuBois, Pennsylvania
 WTKJ-LD in Watertown, New York
 WUDL-LD in Detroit, Michigan
 WUNM-TV in Jacksonville, North Carolina
 WVGN-LD in Charlotte Amalie, U.S. Virgin Islands
 WWKQ-LD in Quebradillas, Puerto Rico
 WXIX-TV in Cincinnati, Ohio
 WXOW in La Crosse, Wisconsin
 WYSJ-CD in Yorktown, Virginia
 WZMQ in Marquette, Michigan

The following television stations, which are no longer licensed, formerly operated on virtual channel 19:
 K19NA-D in Idaho Falls, Idaho
 KGRY-LD in Gila River Indian Community, Arizona
 KJII-LD in Lincoln, Nebraska
 W19DV-D in Luquillo, Puerto Rico
 WAPG-CD in Greeneville, Tennessee
 WAZE-TV in Madisonville, Kentucky
 WCDC-TV in Adams, Massachusetts
 WDXA-LD in Florence, South Carolina
 WUEM-LD in Athens, Georgia

References

19 virtual